The Beasts of Satan were a Satanic group, members of which were tried and convicted of a series of Satanic ritual murders between 1998 and 2004. The persons involved in the group were Andrea Volpe, Nicola Sapone, Paolo Leoni, Mario Maccione, Pietro Guerrieri, Marco Zampollo, Eros Monterosso and Elisabetta Ballarin. The slayings were called "one of the most shocking crimes in post-war Italy" by the BBC.

Crimes and investigation

First murders
The first incident was a January 1998 double homicide that occurred in the woods near Somma Lombardo, northwest of Milan. Chiara Marino, shop assistant, aged 19, and her boyfriend Fabio Tollis, a 16-year-old student and heavy metal musician, were sacrificially stabbed and beaten in a drug-fueled occult rite involving sex and heavy metal music. 
The young couple had spent a normal Saturday night drinking beer and listening to heavy metal music at Midnight Pub, which was the center of the city's metal scene, but never returned home. Both Tollis and Marino were stabbed to death by their friends Andrea Volpe, Nicola Sapone and Mario Maccione. 
Fabio Tollis, a sturdy young man (6 feet and 2 inches tall, 220 pounds) desperately tried to defend himself and his girlfriend Marino but was overpowered by the larger group. Maccione, Sapone and Volpe later buried the corpses in a large grave in the woods and danced on the graves, laughing and screaming "Now you're both zombies! Try to get out of this hole, if you dare!".
The conclusion initially drawn by the authorities at the time was that they had run away together for a love affair, as their friend suggested, but this explanation was not accepted by Tollis' father, Michele Tollis, who began his own investigation. 
Just a few hours before the murder, Nicola Sapone forced Fabio Tollis to call home and tell his father he did not intend to come back home that evening because he preferred sleeping with his girlfriend. Michele Tollis, realizing something was not right with the call he received, immediately reached back out to his son at the Midnight to have a word with him. Unfortunately, it was too late: Fabio and Chiara had already left with their presumed friend for Somma Lombardo and never came back again. 
Michele Tollis discovered just how deeply they had become involved in Satanism and the occult, both common themes of the black metal and death metal genres that his son and friends were interested in. Becoming convinced of a connection between Satanism and their disappearance, Michele Tollis spent the next six years steadily constructing a file on their activities and the bands in which they had played. When the third murder occurred, Tollis took his findings to the police, who used them to link all three murders to Andrea Volpe and the wider Satanic sect.

Third murder and revelations
The third murder was committed in January 2004. Mariangela Pezzotta, 27-year-old shop assistant, prior girlfriend of group member Andrea Volpe was first shot in the throat, mutilated and later buried while she was still alive in a greenhouse in the nearby town of Golasecca not far from Somma Lombardo. Andrea Volpe was arrested shortly after with his young fiancée, an 18-year-old high school student named Elisabetta Ballarin, the daughter of an upper-class family who had run away from home with Volpe when she was just a teenager. Both Volpe and Ballarin were upset because of alcohol and drug addiction. Volpe confessed he invited Pezzotta for a friendly dinner but had already decided to kill her because she knew too many details about the sect and Tollis and Marino's murder. Volpe shot her after a violent fight, then rang Sapone up for help and they realized that, though in agony, Pezzotta was still alive. Volpe recalled that Sapone accused him "You can't even kill a person!" and threatened him; they tried hard to hide the dying girl's body in the greenhouse of Ballarin's parents' home and hit her several times with a heavy spade before burying her still alive. After that, Sapone came back home and pretended nothing had happened. Hours later Volpe and Ballarin took a heavy dose of cocaine and heroin and decided to get rid of Pezzotta's car by driving it into a nearby river but they had a car crash and were arrested. 
After the Pezzotta murder, Volpe was arrested and confessed to the earlier killings, leading police to the bodies of Tollis and Marino. Police investigation used the information previously provided which revealed for the first time the sect's existence. As the investigation continued, Mario Maccione, who presented himself as "the medium" of the group and had been regarded by Tollis as his best friend, confessed to having beaten Fabio to death with a hammer, after Volpe and Sapone had stabbed him and Chiara Marino.

Additionally sect members were accused of pushing their drummer, Andrea Bontade, to commit suicide because he refused to join Volpe and Sapone at Somma Lombardo and help them kill Marino and Tollis. In September 1998, Andrea Bontade drank heavily, then killed himself by crashing his car. Authorities also investigated whether the group had any links to a possible wider network of Satanists in Italy.

Other alleged murders

Involvement of the "Beasts of Satan" has been suspected for up to fourteen other unsolved cases in the same area and timeframe, including alleged suicides, disappearances and violent deaths of people allegedly tied to members of the group. Among these:

 23-year-old construction worker Christian Frigerio, from Brugherio, allegedly a former member of the group, who disappeared on 14 November 1996;
 21-year-old Andrea Ballarin, a childhood friend of Volpe, found hanged in the school he had attended on 7 May 1999;
 28-year-old Angelo Lombardo, caretaker of the cemetery of Legnano and an acquaintance of some members of the group, burned alive in the cemetery on 14 December 1999;
 26-year-old Doriano Molla, found hanged in the woods near Cavaria con Premezzo on 27 December 2000;
 21-year-old Luca Colombo, a flower seller and friend of Nicola Sapone, found hanged in Legnano on 5 May 2004;
 18-year-old carpenter Alberto Scaramuzzino, from Dairago, found burned in his car in the woods near Arconate on 23 May 2004.

Involvement of the group's members in these cases, however, has never been proven. Mario Maccione accused other group members (Sapone, Volpe, Leoni, Zampollo and Monterosso) of being responsible of these crimes, but these accusations have been denied by them and have never been proven.

Trials
On February 22, 2005, Andrea Volpe and Pietro Guerrieri were sentenced in the northern city of Busto Arsizio to 30 and 16 years imprisonment respectively. Volpe, in addition to the 1998 murders, was also found guilty of the 2004 slaying of Pezzotta. In Volpe's case the sentence was a decade longer than requested by prosecutors. A third suspect, Mario Maccione, had also confessed to the murders, but was cleared due to his secondary role in the crimes.

The reactions of the victims' families to the sentencing were mixed. Michele Tollis, the father of Fabio, said "Today justice rewarded me." Lina Marino, mother of the slain Chiara, was outraged at the relatively light sentences Volpe and Guerrieri had received, due to their cooperation with prosecutors. She stated "They are murderers. It's not fair."

Five more members of the group went to trial in June 2005 and were sentenced to long prison terms in early 2006. Nicola Sapone, leader of the group and the suspected mastermind behind the killings, received a life sentence. The other four - Paolo Leoni, Marco Zampollo, Eros Monterosso and Elisabetta Ballarin - were sentenced to between 24 and 26 years for their roles in all three murders. On 2007 the Court of Appeal confirmed the life sentence for Sapone and lengthened the convictions of three other members of the group: Paolo Leoni's 26 years became a life sentence, Marco Zampollo went from 26 years to 29 years and 2 months, and Eros Monterosso was increased from 24 years to 27 years and 3 months (the same increase as Zampollo).  Elisabetta Ballarin's sentence was reduced from 24 years and 3 months to 23 years.  In May 2008 the final court, Court of Cassazione, confirmed all the Appeal's decisions.

Andrea Volpe was released from prison in 2020 and he is currently studying Science of Education.

Elisabetta Ballarin, who was involved in the murder of Mariangela Pezzotta in 2004 and jailed for accessory to murder in 2006, is now free and trying to turn the page about her past. She's currently working in a restaurant in northern Italy.

Reaction
The crimes occurred against a background of growing concern in Italy that Satanism and the occult were becoming increasingly attractive to Italian youth. In February 2005, a Roman Catholic university connected to the Vatican began offering a two-month course on diabolical possession and exorcism for priests and seminarians. In reaction to the crimes, priest Don Aldo Buonaito called for death metal to be banned, saying "If music makes itself an instrument of nefarious deeds and death, it should be stopped."
In light of revelations from the Beasts of Satan investigation and trial, as well as growing public concern, Italian police stated their intention to create a special unit focusing on new religious sects, particularly Satanists and other violent ritualistic groups. It would coordinate nationwide investigations into potentially dangerous new religious movements, and planned to include psychologists and a priest who is an expert on the occult.

During the annual National Carabinieri Day celebrated in Varese on 8 June 2005, the first instance public prosecutors Antonio Pizzi e Tiziano Masini as well as the police officials Enzo Molinari, Quaranta Attilio, Giuseppe Notaro and Paolo Marcolli were awarded by the head of the Italia Arma dei Carabinieri's body for the investigations on the Beast of Satan's murderers.

See also 
List of serial killers by country

References

External links
WorldWide Religious News on the Beasts of Satan
Interview with Father Gabriele Amorth, the Chief Exorcist in Rome.

Crimes involving Satanism or the occult
Italian serial killers
Male serial killers
Murder in Italy
Satanism
Crime in Lombardy